My Mistake may refer to:

"My Mistake (Was to Love You)", 1974 song by Diana Ross and Marvin Gaye
"My Mistake" (Gabrielle Aplin song), 2018 song
"My Mistake" (Cam song), 2015 song
"My Mistake" (Split Enz song), 1977 song
"My Mistake", 2019 song by Vampire Weekend, from the album Father of the Bride
"My Mistake" (Kingbees song), 1980 song Jamie James

See also
My Mistakes